Fossen is a Norwegian surname which can refer to these people:
 
Aksel Fossen (1919–2009), Norwegian politician for the Labour Party
Erling Fossen (born 1963) Norwegian nonfiction writer and former NRK-show host
Hildegunn Fossen (born 1969) retired Norwegian biathlete
Michael Fossen (born 1949) American playwright, television writer, and novelist
Steve Fossen, Founding Member & Original Bassist for Heart (band)
Thor I. Fossen (born 1963), Norwegian professor, author and founder of the company Marine Cybernetics
Tor Røste Fossen (1940–2017), Norwegian former football player and coach

Surnames
Norwegian-language surnames